Tuareg in Niger are Niger citizens of Tuareg descent or persons of Tuareg descent residing in Niger. Ethnic Tuareg in Niger are believed to number of 1,620,000

See also 
Tuareg

References 

Ethnic groups in Niger